Andreas Beck may refer to:
Andreas Beck (explorer) (1864–1914), Norwegian explorer
Andreas Beck (ski jumper) (born 1976), Austrian ski jumper
Andreas Beck (tennis) (born 1986), German tennis player
Andreas Beck (footballer) (born 1987), German football defender